Anna Lefeuvrier (1888–1954) was a French film actress.

Selected filmography
 Jean Chouan (1926)
 The Crystal Submarine (1927)
 Two Timid Souls (1928)
 Night Shift (1932)
 The Wonderful Day (1932)
 The Weaker Sex (1933)
 All for Love (1933)
 The Mondesir Heir (1940)

References

Bibliography
 Powrie, Phil & Rebillard, Éric. Pierre Batcheff and stardom in 1920s French cinema. Edinburgh University Press, 2009.

External links

1888 births
1954 deaths
French film actresses
French silent film actresses
20th-century French actresses
Actresses from Paris